HSC Francisco is a high-speed catamaran built by Incat in Hobart, Tasmania. Propulsion is by two GE LM2500 gas turbines, coupled with two Wärtsilä water-jets.

The catamaran is owned and operated by Argentine-Uruguayan ferry company Buquebus. Francisco plies the  sea route between Buenos Aires and Montevideo.

HSC Francisco is named after Pope Francis.

See also
 List of places and things named after Pope Francis

References

2012 ships
Incat high-speed craft
Individual catamarans
Ferries
Ships of Uruguay